World Team Championship may refer to:
 World Team Championship (pool) (2010–2014), the world team pool championship for Eight-ball, Nine-ball and Ten-ball
 World Team Cup in tennis
 Chess Olympiad
 World Team Chess Championship
 Bermuda Bowl of contract bridge for the Open series in the World Bridge Team Championships
 Venice Cup of contract bridge for the Women's series in the World Bridge Team Championships